Inter Expo Center – Tsarigradsko shose Metro Station is a station on the Sofia Metro in Bulgaria.  It opened on 25 April 2012. Bulgaria's Prime Minister Boyko Borisov and EU Council President Herman Van Rompuy inaugurated the new section of the Sofia Metro, which was funded with EU money. It is located on Tsarigradsko shose.

Interchange with other public transport
 City Bus service: 505
 Suburban Bus service: 1, 3, 5, E6

Location
The longer side of the 11 storey building of "Inter Expo building and congress center - Tsarigradsko shose boulevard" is located about 20 m (65 feet) from the pedestrian exit of the Inter Expo Center metro station . Capital City, a cluster of high-rise buildings, including Capital Fort and Sky Fort is located in proximity.

Gallery

References

External links

 Sofia Metropolitan
 Park and ride at the station
 Sofia Metropolitan

Sofia Metro stations
Railway stations opened in 2012
2012 establishments in Bulgaria